Ratnayake Mudiyanselage Appuhamy (born 9 January 1930) was a Ceylonese politician. He was the member of Parliament of Sri Lanka from Bandarawela representing the Sri Lanka Freedom Party. He was defeated in the 1977 general election.

References

Members of the 6th Parliament of Ceylon
Members of the 7th Parliament of Ceylon
Sri Lanka Freedom Party politicians
1930 births
Date of death missing
Year of death missing